Karen Pavicic (born April 29, 1971) is a Canadian-born Croatian dressage rider. She represented Canada at the 2014 World Equestrian Games, where she placed 9th in the team competition and 41st in the individual dressage competition onboard Don Daiquiri.

Pavicic won a silver medal in team dressage at the 2007 Pan American Games in Rio de Janeiro, Brazil.

In 2018, Pavicic switched her sports allegiance to Croatia after obtaining dual citizenship. Pavicic made her championships debut for Croatia at the 2022 Balkan Championships in Romania, where she topped each class in the senior division.

References

Living people
1971 births
Canadian female equestrians
Pan American Games silver medalists for Canada
Pan American Games medalists in equestrian
Croatian female equestrians
Croatian dressage riders
Equestrians at the 2007 Pan American Games
Croatian people of Canadian descent
Medalists at the 2007 Pan American Games